Albania is a country on the Balkan Peninsula in south-eastern Europe.
 
Albania may also refer to:

Places
 Albania (placename)

Territories related to present-day Albania
 Kingdom of Albania (medieval), Albanian-Angevin kingdom established in 1272
 Venetian Albania, Venetian possessions in southern the coastal area of what is now northern Albania and the coast of Montenegro
 Sanjak of Albania, a subdivision of the Rumelia Eyalet of Ottoman Empire in period 1385–1466
 Albanian Vilayet, a vilayet of the Ottoman Empire projected in 1912 in the western Balkan Peninsula
 Independent Albania, former unrecognized country established in 1912 comprising the territories of Kosovo Vilayet, Monastir Vilayet, Shkodër Vilayet and Janina Vilayet
 Republic of Central Albania, a short-lived unrecognized state established on October 16, 1913, with its administrative centre in Durrës, today in Albania
 Principality of Albania, 1913–25, locally called a kingdom
 Albanian Republic, a 1925–28 republic in Albania which was a de facto protectorate of the Kingdom of Italy
 Albanian Kingdom (1928–39), the constitutional monarchical rule in Albania between 1928 and 1939 which was a de facto protectorate of the Kingdom of Italy
 Albanian Kingdom (1939–43), a protectorate of the Kingdom of Italy
 Albanian Kingdom (1943–44), a puppet state of Nazi Germany
 People's Socialist Republic of Albania, the official name of Albania from 1946 until 1992
 Greater Albania, an irredentist concept of Albanian homeland

Territories not related to present-day Albania
 Caucasian Albania or Arran, a historical territory in the southern Caucasus with borders roughly corresponding to those of modern Azerbaijan
 Albania (satrapy), the same area within the Iranian Sassanid Empire
 Alba, Latinised as Albania, an old Gaelic name for Scotland or Great Britain

Populated places
Albania, La Guajira, Colombia
Albania, Santander, Colombia
Albania, Caquetá, Colombia
 Arbanum or Albania, an Albanian town and former bishopric

Other uses
 Albania (periodical), an Albanian publication by Faik Konica 1896–1910
 Albania (album), a 1973 album by Marinella

See also

Alba (disambiguation)
Albanian (disambiguation)
Albany (disambiguation)
Alban Hills, ancient Latin Albanus Mons, a region near Rome, Italy
Albani people, an ancient tribe living in Italy
Names of the Albanians and Albania